Rhododendron simsii (杜鵑) is a rhododendron species native to East Asia, where it grows at altitudes of .

Description
The flowers range from white to dark red. Some varieties of Rhododendron simsii are poisonous due to the presence of grayanotoxin.

Distribution
The species is common in Hong Kong. It is also distributed in Areas south of Yangtze in China as well as in Vietnam and Thailand.

The specific name simsii commemorates John Sims (1749-1831) who was the first editor of "Magazine Botanique".

This slightly tender species is quite rare in the west, though well known in Chinese gardens.

References

 "Rhododendron simsii", Planchon, Fl. Serres Jard. Eur. 9: 78. 1853–1854. 1853.

simsii
Flora of Hong Kong
Flora of China
Flora of Thailand
Flora of Vietnam